Koliganek Airport  is a state-owned, public-use airport located one nautical mile (1.85 km) east of the central business district of Koliganek, in the Dillingham Census Area of the U.S. state of Alaska. Scheduled airline service to Dillingham Airport is provided by Peninsula Airways (PenAir).

As per Federal Aviation Administration records, this airport had 481 commercial passenger boardings (enplanements) in calendar year 2008, a decrease of 21% from the 606 enplanements in 2007. Koliganek Airport is included in the FAA's National Plan of Integrated Airport Systems (2009–2013), which categorizes it as a general aviation facility.

Although most U.S. airports use the same three-letter location identifier for the FAA and IATA, this airport is assigned JZZ by the FAA and KGK by the IATA.

Facilities and aircraft 
The current airport has one runway designated 9/27 with a gravel surface measuring 3,000 by 75 feet (914 × 23 m).

Airlines and destinations

References

External links 
 .  Department of Transportation & Public Facilities - Central Region. 5-2-1994.
 Airport diagram of Koliganek (JZZ) (GIF). FAA, Alaska Region. 19 Feb 2004.
 

Airports in the Dillingham Census Area, Alaska